ACE Charity [Assisting, Empowering and Caring] is a non-profit organization located in Nigeria with a focus on education and training, affordable healthcare, and economic empowerment. It has implemented development and humanitarian interventions aimed at improving the living conditions of orphans, and vulnerable children (especially adolescent girls), and women in Nigeria. It aims to provide quality education for underprivileged people all over Africa starting with Nigeria.

During its fundraising dinner at Transcorp Hilton on November 26, 2016, it raised millions of naira to provide access to literacy and support the development of quality education for underprivileged children in Nigeria and Africa.

Initiatives 
Its learning initiative ACE Radio School helps primary and secondary school children learn STEM subjects while at home without access to online learning during the COVID-19 pandemic. Its radio program is broadcast several days a week in nine states, reaching over 18 million listeners in Nigeria.

It provided access to literacy and numeracy skills to out-of-school children in communities in Sokoto State in learning centers called 'safe spaces'.

To support ongoing efforts to improve girl child education outcomes in the northern states; Adamawa, Borno and Kano, The charity advocated for the enactment of the Child Rights Act which grants children the right to education for nine years. The Founder of the organization, Kiki James has been recognized as a Malala Fund Gulmaki Champion for promoting girl child education in Nigeria.

Business Empowerment Program for Women is a yearly program that equips women with basic sewing skills and business skills needed to establish their own businesses. The program lasts six months. In the three years from 2017 to 2020 it trained 24 women.

The 'Careers at Hilton' program aims to give selected Nigerian youth transferable skills through work experience and mentoring at Transcorp Hilton.

Its mobile clinics provide free healthcare services to indigenes of rural communities.

It collects, recycles and distributes used soaps discarded by the Transcorp Hilton, Abuja.

References

External links
 

Organizations established in 2010
Organizations based in Abuja
Charities based in Nigeria
2010 establishments in Nigeria